Christmas Kisses is the debut Christmas record and extended play (EP) by American singer Ariana Grande. It was released on December 13, 2013, in most countries, and on December 17, 2013, in the United States, as a collection of two covers of classic Christmas songs, and two original songs. On December 3, 2014, the Japanese special edition was released for CD and two days later for digital download. It peaked at number twenty-five on the Oricon chart. The Japanese edition included a new track, "Santa Tell Me", which was released on November 24, 2014, as the fifth and final single from the EP. The EP went on to sell 68,871 copies in the US and over 405,000 copies worldwide.

Background and release
On November 6, 2013, Grande announced via Twitter she would be releasing new music each week leading up to Christmas, beginning with a cover of Wham!'s "Last Christmas": "I'm releasing new music for Christmas! New song every week as a countdown to the holidays starting Nov 19. Beyond excited to share them w/ U! The 1st song #LastChristmas out Nov 19. I can't wait for u to hear our spin on it. There will be originals as well! Hope u love the music."

"Last Christmas" was released as the lead single, opening up to positive reviews and was critically acclaimed for its "R&B and Soul spin" on the Christmas classic. On the final week of November, Grande released an original Christmas song, titled "Love Is Everything", and it was also revealed Grande would be releasing Christmas Kisses later that month. In the first week of December, Grande released another original Christmas song "Snow in California" and was later followed by a cover of the 1953 classic "Santa Baby", which features Grande's former Victorious co-star Elizabeth Gillies.

In November 2014, Grande announced she would release the special edition of the EP exclusively in Japan. The special edition included a new track "Santa Tell Me", released on November 24, 2014, as the fifth and final single from Christmas Kisses. The song was written by Grande, Savan Kotecha and Ilya Salmanzadeh and peaked at number seventeen on the US Billboard Hot 100 and number eleven on the UK Singles Chart.

On December 5, the Japanese special edition was released on Japanese iTunes. It was released physically on December 3, two days before the digital release. It peaked at number twenty-five on the Oricon Albums Chart, becoming her third album to peak on that chart, following Yours Truly (2013) and My Everything (2014).

Promotion
Preceding the release of her Christmas EP, she gave a series of performances, including at the 87th annual Macy's Thanksgiving Day Parade, NBC New York's Rockefeller Center Christmas Tree lighting broadcast, the KIIS-FM Jingle Ball in Los Angeles' Staples Center and Z100's Jingle Ball event at Madison Square Garden in New York City. She also sang at Dick Clark's New Year's Rockin' Eve, with Big Sean and Mac Miller.

Singles

Last Christmas

Love Is Everything

Snow in California

Santa Baby

Track listing

Personnel and credits

Credits adapted from Discogs (standard edition).

 Ariana Grande: vocals
 Liz Gillies: vocals
 India Benet: background vocals
 Kenneth "Babyface" Edmonds: producer, composer, lyricist, guitar
 Antonio Dixon: producer, composer, lyricist, programming 
 The Rascals: producers, programming
 Khristopher Riddick-Tynes: composer, lyricist
 Leon Thomas III: composer, lyricist
 George Michael: composer, lyricist
 Joan Javits: composer, lyricist

 Philip Springer: composer, lyricist
 Tony Springer: composer, lyricist
 Ivy Skoff: strings
 Demonte Posey: strings
 Paul Boutin: recording, mixing
 Tony Maserati: mixing
 James Krausse: engineer
 Jon Castelli: engineer
 Justin Hergett: engineer

Charts

Release history

References

2013 Christmas albums
2013 debut EPs
Albums produced by Babyface (musician)
Albums produced by Ilya Salmanzadeh
Ariana Grande albums
Christmas albums by American artists
Christmas EPs
Contemporary R&B Christmas albums
Pop Christmas albums
Republic Records EPs